Kingsford Heights is a town in Union Township, LaPorte County, Indiana, United States. The population was 1,335 at the 2020 census. It is included in the Michigan City, Indiana-La Porte, Indiana Metropolitan Statistical Area. Also known as "Victory City," the town was built by the United States government for workers that worked in the Kingsbury Ordnance Plant, an ammunitions plant that served the US during World War II and later the Korean War.

History
Kingsford Heights had its start during World War II as a residential district for civilian workers at the Kingsbury Ordnance Plant which at one point employed over 20,000 people.

Geography
Kingsford Heights is located at  (41.481237, -86.692406).

Demographics

2010 census
As of the census of 2010, there were 1,435 people, 509 households, and 374 families living in the town. The racial makeup of the town was 86.3% White, 8.1% African American, 0.6% Native American, 0.3% Asian, 1.1% from other races, and 3.7% from two or more races. Hispanic or Latino of any race were 5.0% of the population.

There were 509 households, of which 42.4% had children under the age of 18 living with them, 45.0% were married couples living together, 21.2% had a female householder with no husband present, 7.3% had a male householder with no wife present, and 26.5% were non-families. 22.4% of all households were made up of individuals, and 9.6% had someone living alone who was 65 years of age or older. The average household size was 2.82 and the average family size was 3.26.

The median age in the town was 33 years. 30.2% of residents were under the age of 18; 8.9% were between the ages of 18 and 24; 25.9% were from 25 to 44; 24.1% were from 45 to 64; and 10.9% were 65 years of age or older. The gender makeup of the town was 47.3% male and 52.7% female.

2000 census
As of the census of 2000, there were 1,453 people, 495 households, and 388 families living in the town. The racial makeup of the town was 86.03% White, 9.70% African American, 0.07% Native American, 0.07% Asian, 0.34% Pacific Islander, 0.69% from other races, and 3.10% from two or more races. Hispanic or Latino of any race were 1.79% of the population.

There were 495 households, out of which 42.0% had children under the age of 18 living with them, 53.9% were married couples living together, 18.8% had a female householder with no husband present, and 21.6% were non-families. 18.0% of all households were made up of individuals, and 7.9% had someone living alone who was 65 years of age or older. The average household size was 2.94 and the average family size was 3.30.

In the town, the population was spread out, with 32.8% under the age of 18, 8.1% from 18 to 24, 31.0% from 25 to 44, 19.3% from 45 to 64, and 8.8% who were 65 years of age or older. The median age was 30 years. For every 100 females, there were 94.3 males. For every 100 females age 18 and over, there were 87.7 males.

The median income for a household in the town was $32,169, and the median income for a family was $34,000. Males had a median income of $31,065 versus $21,477 for females. The per capita income for the town was $13,961. About 11.4% of families and 13.4% of the population were below the poverty line, including 18.4% of those under age 18 and 9.1% of those age 65 or over.

Education
Kingsford Heights has an elementary school, Kingsford Heights Elementary School, a member of the La Porte Community School Corporation. The town lies inside 3 school districts, giving families the option to enroll students in LaPorte Community School Corporation, Oregon-Davis Community School Corporation, or South Central Community Schools. Kingsford Heights also has a public library, a branch of the LaPorte County Public Library.

References

Towns in LaPorte County, Indiana
Towns in Indiana